The 2023 World Junior Curling Championships were held from February 25 to March 4 at the National Traning Centre for Ice Hockey and Curling in Füssen, Germany.

Men

Qualification
The following nations qualified to participate in the 2023 World Junior Curling Championship:

Teams
The teams are listed as follows:

Round robin standings
Final Round Robin Standings

Round robin results

Draw 1
Saturday, February 25, 14:00

Draw 2
Sunday, February 26, 9:00

Draw 3
Sunday, February 26, 19:00

Draw 4
Monday, February 27, 14:00

Draw 5
Tuesday, February 28, 9:00

Draw 6
Tuesday, February 28, 19:00

Draw 7
Wednesday, March 1, 14:00

Draw 8
Thursday, March 2, 9:00

Draw 9
Thursday, March 2, 19:00

Playoffs

Semifinals
Friday, March 3, 19:00

Bronze medal game
Saturday, March 4, 14:00

Final
Saturday, March 4, 14:00

Final standings

Women

Qualification
The following nations qualified to participate in the 2023 World Junior Curling Championship:

Teams
The teams are listed as follows:

Round robin standings
Final Round Robin Standings

Round robin results

Draw 1
Saturday, February 25, 9:00

Draw 2
Saturday, February 25, 19:30

Draw 3
Sunday, February 26, 14:00

Draw 4
Monday, February 27, 9:00

Draw 5
Monday, February 27, 19:00

Draw 6
Tuesday, February 28, 14:00

Draw 7
Wednesday, March 1, 9:00

Draw 8
Wednesday, March 1, 19:00

Draw 9
Thursday, March 2, 14:00

Playoffs

Semifinals
Friday, March 3, 14:00

Bronze medal game
Saturday, March 4, 9:00

Final
Saturday, March 4, 9:00

Final standings

References

World Junior Curling Championships
2023 in curling
February 2023 sports events in Germany
March 2023 sports events in Germany
International curling competitions hosted by Germany
Sport in Füssen